Mapleton-Fall Creek is a historic neighborhood in Indianapolis, bounded on the east and south by Fall Creek Parkway South Drive, by Meridian Street on the west, and by 38th Street on the north. The population was 3,460 as of the 2000 Census.

History 
Mapleton-Fall Creek was platted in the late 1870s. Middle-class to upper-middle class residents moved northward as the city expanded. They were attracted to the area due to its shaded, tree-lined streets and abundance of streetcar lines.

In the 1950s, well-to-do African Americans began moving into the neighborhood and comprised the majority of Mapleton Fall-Creek residents by 1970. Compared to other Indianapolis neighborhoods, Mapleton Fall-Creek has retained much of its original infrastructure and housing stock.

Present day 
The neighborhood boasting towering trees, winding boulevards, and a wonderful blend of start of the 20th century homes that feature details and designs of the Tudor Revival, Colonial Revival, and Arts and Crafts styles. Many homes are more stately, while others are more modest in nature.

MFC residents have access to several of Indianapolis' most convenient thoroughfares (Fall Creek Parkway, Meridian Street and Central Avenue) as well as IndyGo routes, the Monon Trail and Fall Creek Trail. Most recently, the process of gentrification has begun to  attract professionals who take advantage of the neighborhood's character, housing stock, and proximity to the city center.

Mapleton-Fall Creek is adjacent to the Butler-Tarkington, Meridian-Kessler, Fall Creek Place, and United Northwest neighborhoods.

References
Homepage

Neighborhoods in Indianapolis
1870s establishments in Indiana